In functional analysis, a branch of mathematics, a compact operator is a linear operator , where  are normed vector spaces, with the property that  maps bounded subsets of  to relatively compact subsets of  (subsets with compact closure in ). Such an operator is necessarily a bounded operator, and so continuous. Some authors require that  are Banach, but the definition can be extended to more general spaces.

Any bounded operator  that has finite rank is a compact operator; indeed, the class of compact operators is a natural generalization of the class of finite-rank operators in an infinite-dimensional setting. When  is a Hilbert space, it is true that any compact operator is a limit of finite-rank operators, so that the class of compact operators can be defined alternatively as the closure of the set of finite-rank operators in the norm topology. Whether this was true in general for Banach spaces (the approximation property) was an unsolved question for many years; in 1973 Per Enflo gave a counter-example, building on work by Grothendieck and Banach.

The origin of the theory of compact operators is in the theory of integral equations, where integral operators supply concrete examples of such operators. A typical Fredholm integral equation gives rise to a compact operator K on function spaces; the compactness property is shown by equicontinuity. The method of approximation by finite-rank operators is basic in the numerical solution of such equations. The abstract idea of Fredholm operator is derived from this connection.

Equivalent formulations 

Let  be normed spaces and  a linear operator. Then the following statements are equivalent, and some of them are used as the principal definition by different authors
  is a compact operator;
If in addition  is Banach, these statements are also equivalent to:

If a linear operator is compact, then it is continuous.

Important properties 

Equivalently,  
Notably, this "approximation property" is false for general Banach spaces X and Y.
Any compact operator is strictly singular, but not vice versa.
 A bounded linear operator between Banach spaces is compact if and only if its adjoint is compact (Schauder's theorem). 
 If  is bounded and compact, then:
 If  is a Banach space and there exists an invertible bounded compact operator  then  is necessarily finite-dimensional.

 For any , then   is a Fredholm operator of index 0. In particular,   is closed. This is essential in developing the spectral properties of compact operators.
 If  then the following are finite and equal: 
 If  is infinite-dimensional then .

Origins in integral equation theory

A crucial property of compact operators is the Fredholm alternative, which asserts that the existence of solution of linear equations of the form

(where K is a compact operator, f is a given function, and u is the unknown function to be solved for) behaves much like as in finite dimensions. The spectral theory of compact operators then follows, and it is due to Frigyes Riesz (1918).  It shows that a compact operator K on an infinite-dimensional Banach space has spectrum that is either a finite subset of C which includes 0, or the spectrum is a countably infinite subset of C which has 0 as its only limit point.  Moreover, in either case the non-zero elements of the spectrum are eigenvalues of K with finite multiplicities (so that K − λI has a finite-dimensional kernel for all complex λ ≠ 0).

An important example of a compact operator is compact embedding of Sobolev spaces, which, along with the Gårding inequality and the Lax–Milgram theorem, can be used to convert an elliptic boundary value problem into a Fredholm integral equation. Existence of the solution and spectral properties then follow from the theory of compact operators; in particular, an elliptic boundary value problem on a bounded domain has infinitely many isolated eigenvalues. One consequence is that a solid body can vibrate only at isolated frequencies, given by the eigenvalues, and arbitrarily high vibration frequencies always exist.

The compact operators from a Banach space to itself form a two-sided ideal in the algebra of all bounded operators on the space. Indeed, the compact operators on an infinite-dimensional separable Hilbert space form a maximal ideal, so the quotient algebra, known as the Calkin algebra, is simple.  More generally, the compact operators form an operator ideal.

Compact operator on Hilbert spaces

For Hilbert spaces, another equivalent definition of compact operators is given as follows.

An operator  on an infinite-dimensional Hilbert space 

is said to be compact if it can be written in the form

The singular values can accumulate only at zero.

The bracket  is the scalar product on the Hilbert space; the sum on the right hand side converges in the operator norm.

An important subclass of compact operators is the trace-class or nuclear operators.

Completely continuous operators 
Let X and Y be Banach spaces.  A bounded linear operator T : X → Y is called completely continuous if, for every weakly convergent sequence  from X, the sequence  is norm-convergent in Y  .  Compact operators on a Banach space are always completely continuous.  If X is a reflexive Banach space, then every completely continuous operator T : X → Y is compact.

Somewhat confusingly, compact operators are sometimes referred to as "completely continuous" in older literature, even though they are not necessarily completely continuous by the definition of that phrase in modern terminology.

Examples 
 Every finite rank operator is compact.
 For  and a sequence (tn) converging to zero, the multiplication operator (Tx)n = tn xn is compact.
 For some fixed g ∈ C([0, 1]; R), define the linear operator T from C([0, 1]; R) to C([0, 1]; R) by That the operator T is indeed compact follows from the Ascoli theorem.
 By Riesz's lemma, the identity operator is a compact operator if and only if the space is finite-dimensional.

See also

Notes

References

 
 
 
 
 
  
  
  (Section 7.5)
  
  
  

Compactness (mathematics)
Linear operators
Operator theory